is a Japanese marketing firm and talent agency headquartered in Shibuya, Tokyo. It was found in 2006 and focuses on various marketing related businesses in the entertainment industry, including talent management.

The company was established initially as a marketing firm specializing in "Culture Branding", providing services and content production for various media, events and talents. Currently, they continue these services while maintaining themselves as a talent agency mainly for female fashion models and television personalities.

Current notable talents 

 Nana Suzuki
 Akari Suda (former SKE48)
 Anna Murashige (former HKT48)
 Miki Nishino (former AKB48)
 Misako Aoki
 Akishibu Project
 Ayane Konuma (Seishun Koukou 3-nen C-gumi)
 Chiho Ishida (STU48)

Past notable talents 

 Sifow
 Ayana Tsubaki
 Tenka Hashimoto
 Kazue Akita (former SDN48)

References

External links 

 Twin Planet official website
 Twin Planet Entertainment official website

Mass media companies based in Tokyo
Entertainment companies of Japan
Japanese talent agencies
Talent agencies based in Tokyo
Mass media companies established in 2006
Japanese companies established in 2006